Hibret Manufacturing and Machine Building Industry (Amharic: ሕብረት ማምረቻ እና የማሽን ግንባታ ኢንዱስትሪ; Hibret mamireti ina yemashini ginibata) is a military-civil engineering complex of the Ethiopian Defense Industry. It specializes in production of Machines and spare parts  for the Ethiopian National Defense Force.

History
Hibret Machine tools was established on May 5, 1953 to produce bullets for light weapons under the name Emperor Haile Sellassie I (Amharic: ቀዳማዊ ኃይለ ሥላሴ) Ammunition Factory. In 1984, the Derg regime invested heavily to expand the ammunition production line and create a tools and spare parts production unit.

Structure
Hibret Machine tools were restructured which resulted in its ammunition unit transferred to Homicho Ammunition Engineering Complex and currently is organized as follows:

 Tools and spare parts and medium weapons production unit
 Engraving and pressing products unit
 Metals and product packaging production unit

Products
Military - a variety of mortars

Civilian - hand tools, hospital beds, aluminum saddles, household and office furnitures

References
 Hibret Machine tools profile - FDRE Defense Industry, May 2008

Military industrial facilities of Ethiopia